The Heritage Hunter Tour was a joint concert tour by American sludge metal band Mastodon and Swedish progressive metal band Opeth. Opeth and Mastodon each headlined specific concerts. Ghost was the tour's opening act.

Tour dates

Personnel

Mastodon
 Troy Sanders –  Vocals, bass guitar
 Brent Hinds – Vocals, guitar 
 Bill Kelliher – Guitar, backing vocals
 Brann Dailor – Vocals, drums

Opeth
 Mikael Åkerfeldt – Lead vocals, guitars
 Martín Méndez – Bass guitar
 Martin "Axe" Axenrot – Drums, percussion
 Fredrik Åkesson – Guitars, backing vocals
 Joakim Svalberg – Keyboards, synthesizer, backing vocals, percussion

With:

Ghost
 Papa Emeritus – Vocals
 Nameless Ghouls – Drums, bass guitar, two guitars, keyboards

References

External links
 Official Mastodon website
 Official Opeth website
 Official Ghost website

2012 concert tours